Wassim Helal (born 16 July 1982) is a Tunisian handball goalkeeper. He competed for the Tunisian national team at the 2012 Summer Olympics in London, where the Tunisian team reached the quarter finals.

References

External links

1982 births
Living people
People from Monastir Governorate
Tunisian male handball players
Olympic handball players of Tunisia
Handball players at the 2012 Summer Olympics
21st-century Tunisian people
20th-century Tunisian people